"Tennessee Moon" is a country music song written by Gene Branch, sung by Cowboy Copas, and released in 1947 on the King label (catalog no. 714). In July 1948, it reached No. 7 on the Billboard folk best seller and juke box charts. It was also ranked as the No. 27 record on the Billboard 1948 year-end folk record sellers chart.

References

Cowboy Copas songs
1947 songs